Viburnum utile, the service viburnum, is a species of flowering plant in the family Viburnaceae, native to central and southern China. A leggy evergreen shrub reaching , it is rarely found in commerce. Instead, its chief utility has been as a parent to viburnum hybrids, including Viburnum × burkwoodii (with V. carlesii) and Viburnum × pragense (with V. rhytidophyllum). The V. × burkwoodii cultivars 'Mohawk' and 'Park Farm Hybrid', and the V. × pragense cultivar 'Pragense' have all gained the Royal Horticultural Society's Award of Garden Merit.

References

utile
Endemic flora of China
Flora of North-Central China
Flora of South-Central China
Flora of Southeast China
Plants described in 1888